The Director General of Sri Lanka Coast Guard is the professional head of the Sri Lanka Coast Guard. He is the most senior officer in Sri Lanka Coast Guard and oversees all Coast Guard personnel throughout the country. The DG SLCG reports to the minister of defence, when the Coast Guard Service is under the Ministry of Defence as it is currently. The current director general of Sri Lanka Coast Guard is Rear Admiral Pujitha Vithana.

See also
 Sri Lanka Coast Guard

External links
http://coastguard.gov.lk/index.php?id=10
https://coastguard.gov.lk/director-general-of-slcg/

Sri Lanka
Military of Sri Lanka